Radio Bosanska Krupa is a Bosnian local public radio station, broadcasting from Bosanska Krupa, Bosnia and Herzegovina. As a municipal radio, this station broadcasts a variety of programs such as local news, talk shows and music. Program is mainly produced in Bosnian language at one FM frequency (Bosanska Krupa ).

Estimated number of potential listeners of Radio Bosanska Krupa is around 22,175.

Due to the geographical position in Bosanska Krajina area, this radiostation is also available in municipalities: 
Bihać, Cazin, Sanski Most, Bužim, Bosanski Novi and in a part of the Karlovac and Sisak-Moslavina County in neighboring Croatia.

Frequencies
 Bosanska Krupa

See also 
List of radio stations in Bosnia and Herzegovina

References

External links 
 Radio Bosanska Krupa page on Facebook
 www.radiobk.ba
 Communications Regulatory Agency of Bosnia and Herzegovina

Bosanska Krupa